Alexander Smyth (1765April 17, 1830) was an American lawyer, soldier, and politician from Virginia.  Smyth served in the Virginia Senate, Virginia House of Delegates, United States House of Representatives and as a general during the War of 1812.  Smyth County, Virginia, is named in his honor.

Early life
Smyth was born on Rathlin Island in County Antrim (part of the Kingdom of Ireland). He immigrated to the United States with his father, Rev. Alfred Smythe at the age of 10, and settled in Botetourt County, Virginia, in 1775 where he completed preparatory studies. He studied law, and was admitted to the bar and commenced practice in Abingdon, Virginia.

Smyth moved to Wythe County, Virginia, and was a member of the Virginia House of Delegates in 1792, 1796, 1801, 1802, and from 1804 to 1808. He served in the Virginia Senate in 1808 and 1809.

Military career
Smyth served in the United States Army from 1808 to 1813. Commissioned as a colonel in 1808, he served as Inspector General to William Eustis, the acting War Secretary.

Shortly after the outbreak of the War of 1812, Smyth was promoted to brigadier general on July 6, 1812. During the Battle of Queenston Heights he refused to support his commander, General Stephen Van Rensselaer, a militia commander with no experience. After Van Rensselaer's disgrace, Smyth was given command and proved himself equally inept. His plan to invade Canada started with the Battle of Frenchman's Creek but was then abandoned because of problems due to poor organization.

After the failed attack on Canada, Smyth was insulted by Brigadier General Peter B. Porter, who accused Smyth of cowardice.  Smyth challenged Porter to a duel, but both men went unscathed. The historian John R. Elting wrote of the duel, stating, "Unfortunately, both missed." In the wake of his failure, Smyth's name was removed from the U.S. Army rolls.

Postwar career
After the war, Smyth resumed the practice of law, and again became a member of the Virginia House of Delegates in 1816, 1817, 1826, and 1827. He was elected to the Fifteenth United States Congress and reelected to the Sixteenth, Seventeenth, and Eighteenth Congresses, serving from March 4, 1817, to March 3, 1825. He was elected again to the Twentieth and Twenty-first Congresses, serving again from March 4, 1827, until his death.

Smyth died in Washington, D.C., and was interred in the United States Congressional Cemetery. Smyth County, Virginia, is named after him.

Electoral history

1817; Smyth was elected to the U.S. House of Representatives with 66.99% of the vote, defeating Federalist Benjamin Estill.
1819; Smyth was re-elected unopposed.
1821; Smyth was re-elected unopposed.

See also

List of United States Congress members who died in office (1790–1899)

References
Notes

Bibliography

External links
 

1765 births
1830 deaths
American people of Scotch-Irish descent
Inspectors General of the United States Army
Irish emigrants to the United States (before 1923)
Members of the Virginia House of Delegates
United States Army generals
Virginia state senators
United States Army personnel of the War of 1812
Burials at the Congressional Cemetery
Virginia lawyers
Politicians from Abingdon, Virginia
Democratic-Republican Party members of the United States House of Representatives from Virginia
Jacksonian members of the United States House of Representatives from Virginia
19th-century American politicians
American duellists
People from Botetourt County, Virginia
18th-century American lawyers